Sangatpur is a village in Shahkot in Jalandhar district of Punjab, India. The village is administrated by a sarpanch who is an elected representative of village as per Panchayati raj (India).

Demography 
As of 2011, Qadian has 73 houses and a population of 308, of which 169 are males and 139 are females, according to the report published by the Census of India in 2011. Literacy rate of the village is 70.18%, lower than state average of 75.84%. The population of children under the age of 6 years is 33 which is 10.71% of total population of the village, and child sex ratio is approximately 500 lower than state average of 846.

Most of the people are from Schedule Caste, constituting 18.83% of total population in the village. The town does not have any Schedule Tribe population so far.

As per the 2011 census, 124 people, of which 100 were males and 24 were females, were engaged in work activities. According to the 2011 census survey report, 85.48% of workers describe their work as main work while the other 14.52% of workers are involved in marginal activity providing livelihood for less than 6 months.

Transport 
Shahkot Malisian station is the nearest train station. The nearest international airport is located in Chandigarh.

See also 
List of villages in India

References 

Villages in Jalandhar district